Aitard de Vaux, also known as Aitard de Vals, was an 11th-century noble. A Norman knight, Aitard participated in William, Duke of Normandy's invasion of England in 1066, with his brother Robert. He held lands in Norfolk and Suffolk in England from Roger Bigod, as a tenant in chief. He was succeeded by his son Robert.

Notes

Citations

References

11th-century English people
Aitard